Tent of Miracles is the thirteenth studio album by the band Spirit released through Line Records in 1990. It features original Spirit members Randy California, Ed Cassidy and newcomer Mike Nile.

Track listing 
All songs written by Randy California except noted.

Personnel

Spirit 
Randy California – Guitars, vocals, bass
Ed Cassidy – Drums, percussion
Mike Nile – Bass, vocals

Production 
Kevin Gray - Mastering

References 

Spirit (band) albums
1990 albums